Dale Brockman Davis (born 1945) is a Los Angeles-based African-American artist, gallerist and educator best known for his assemblage sculpture and ceramic work that addresses themes of African American history and music, especially jazz. Along with his brother, artist Alonzo Davis, he co-founded Brockman Gallery in Leimert Park. Through the gallery and his broader community work, Davis became an important promoter of African-American artists in Los Angeles.

Biography
Davis was born in Tuskegee, Alabama on November 11, 1945. He moved to Los Angeles in 1956.  He studied at Los Angeles City College before earning his B.F.A. at the University of Southern California. There he studied with noted ceramist F. Carlton Ball. He would eventually move beyond vessels and other traditional ceramic forms, instead focusing on sculpture.  He was inspired by assemblage art scene that emerged in Los Angeles's African-American community following the Watts Rebellion of 1965.

He did graduate work towards his M.F.A. at the University of California, Los Angeles but stopped the program after encountering resistance towards his assemblage style.

Davis also worked as an art teacher and chairman of the art department at Dorsey High School.

Brockman Gallery
Dale and Alonzo Davis ran Brockman Gallery from 1967 to 1989. They were inspired to found the gallery after a consciousness-raising road trip across the United States and Canada in 1966. They named the gallery after their grandmother, Della Brockman. They showcased the work of African-American artists from Los Angeles and elsewhere, provided them with a rare opportunity to exhibit and sell their work in Los Angeles's segregated art scene.  Included among their list of local artists were: Charles Wilbert White, Betye Saar, John Outterbridge, Noah Purifoy, Tim Washington, Doyle Lane, and Marion Epting.

By the early 1970s, the brothers had transformed the gallery into a broader community art space and hosted a festival in Leimert Park.

In 2019, Davis donated the Brockman Gallery Archive to the Los Angeles Public Library.

Awards
 Leimert Park Art Festival, First Place in Sculpture

Galleries
Gallery shows include:

 Gallery Negra
 Bob Jefferson Gallery, Oakland
 Ankrum Gallery, Los Angeles
 Brockman Gallery, Los Angeles

Group exhibitions
He has appeared in many exhibitions, including:

 California Black Craftsmen, Mills College Art Gallery, 1970
 Eleven from California, Studio Museum in Harem, 1972
 Los Angeles 1972: A Panorama of Black Artists, Los Angeles County Museum of Art, 1972
 Collage and Assemblage, Los Angeles Institute of Contemporary Art, 1975
 Black Art: The LA Connection, Los Angeles Convention Center, 1982
 Artists Teachers, Museum of African American Art,  Santa Monica, 1983
 Watts: Art and Social Change in Los Angeles, Haggerty Museum of Art, Marquette University, 2003
 L.A. Object and David Hammons Body Prints, Tilton Gallery, 2006
 Distinctly Los Angeles: An African American Perspective, M. Hanks Gallery, Santa Monica, 2009
 Now Dig This! Art & Black Los Angeles, 1960-1980, Hammer Museum, 2011
 Places of Validation, California African American Museum, 2011
 Diverted Destruction 6, California African American Museum and Loft at Liz's, 2013
New Digs/Old Finds: Dale Davis, Assemblage Sculptures (solo exhibition), Loft2, San Pedro, 2019

Notes

External links
 Official website

American ceramists
American potters
1945 births
Living people
Artists from Los Angeles
People from Tuskegee, Alabama
20th-century American artists
21st-century American artists
21st-century ceramists
African-American art dealers
American art dealers
20th-century African-American artists
21st-century African-American artists